Thelymitra holmesii, commonly called the blue star sun orchid, is a species of orchid that is endemic to south-eastern Australia. It has a single long, narrow, fleshy leaf and up to nine purplish blue to mauve flowers with a deeply notched lobe on top of the anther.

Description
There are two bracts on the flowering stem. The lobe on the top of the anther is dark purple to almost black with a curved, deeply notched yellow top. The side lobes have loose tufts of white, toothbrush-like hairs. The flowers are self-pollinated and only open on hot days, and then only slowly. Flowering occurs from October to December.

Taxonomy and naming
Thelymitra holmesii was first formally described in 1933 by William Henry Nicholls from a specimen collected near Portland and the description was published in The Victorian Naturalist. The specific epithet (holmesii) honours "Murray Holmes, a youthful and energetic orchidologist".

Distribution and habitat
The blue star sun orchid grows in winter wet or swampy places, sometimes in disturbed areas, forest woodland or heath. It grows in southern Victoria, near Bundanoon in New South Wales, in the south-east of South Australia and in scattered populations in Tasmania.

Conservation
Thelymitra holmesii is listed as "vulnerable" in South Australia and as "rare" under the Tasmanian Threatened Species Protection Act 1995.

References

External links
 
 

holmesii
Endemic orchids of Australia
Orchids of New South Wales
Orchids of Victoria (Australia)
Orchids of South Australia
Orchids of Tasmania
Plants described in 1933